Bodily is a surname. Notable people with the surname include:

 Blake Bodily (born 1998), American soccer player
 Ritchie Bodily (1918–1997), British philatelist and stamp dealer
 Samuel E. Bodily (born 20th century), American professor